Maxime Belouet (born 11 August 1986) is a French footballer.

Style of Play
Maxime is an attacking midfielder cum play-maker with good vision and great passing skills. He is a natural left footer specializing in free-kicks and set pieces.

Personal
Maxime is a supporter of Olympique de Marseille. He listens to rap music and loves to have Pasta.

Club career

France
Maxime started playing for the youth team of current Championnat National team Amiens SC in 2002. He then played in top level of French youth football representing different clubs like Angers SCO(currently plays in Ligue 2), AS Beauvais Oise. In 2006, he began his professional career after signing with Championnat National side Vannes OC. He then moved to US Roye-Noyon in the 2007–2008 season where he had a good stint after scoring 15 goals in 30 appearances. In the next season he signed for US Orléans (currently plays in Championnat National), his hometown club and he played there for the next three seasons.

Singapore
Maxime first moved out of France in 2011 to Singapore to play for the S.League club Étoile FC. He made his debut in the opening round match of the 2011 S.League season in which they won 2–0 over Geylang United, with Maxime opening the scoring in the 39th minute. He was part of the team which secured fifth place for Étoile FC in the 2011 S.League. At the end of 2011 S.League, Étoile FC pulled out from the S.League, making him a free player. He was also selected in the S.League All Stars team for a charity match to support earthquake victims of Japan.

India
On 14 February 2012, Salgaocar SC, the I-League club, announced the signing of Maxime Belouet as their fourth Foreign Visa player and registered him for the 2012 AFC Cup and I-League. He was the first French footballer to ply his trade in India. He played both in the 2012–13 I-League and 2012 AFC Cup matches for the club where his performance was highly praised by football fans and critics and he was compared to be equally good to the famous Mohun Bagan A.C. player Jose Ramirez Barreto. He then got injured while playing against Al-Oruba SC of Oman in the 2012 AFC Cup. As a result, he had to go back to France to get the top treatment. He later recovered from the injury totally and became fit to play in the 2013–14 I-League season.

Switzerland
In August 2013, though he was under a contract with Salgaocar SC he moved to Switzerland to train with FC Montreux-Sports and also in order to find a new professional club. He played a few friendly matches for the Montreux-based club then playing in the 2. Liga Interregional, fourth division of the Swiss football league system.

Bangladesh
In September 2013, he moved to Bangladesh and signed a contract with Dhaka-based club Sheikh Russel KC. He played 3 matches in the 2013–14 Bangladesh Football Premier League and 2 in the 2013 Bangladesh Federation Cup. But later in the same season due to some disputes with the club management and some financial delays he decided to terminate his contract with the club.

References

External links
Maxime Belouet at Goal.com

1986 births
Living people
Footballers from Orléans
French footballers
French expatriate footballers
Association football midfielders
Amiens SC players
AS Beauvais Oise players
Angers SCO players
Vannes OC players
US Orléans players
Étoile Carouge FC players
Salgaocar FC players
Fanja SC players
Ligue 2 players
Singapore Premier League players
I-League players
Oman Professional League players
Expatriate footballers in Singapore
French expatriate sportspeople in Singapore
Expatriate footballers in India
French expatriate sportspeople in India
Expatriate footballers in Switzerland
French expatriate sportspeople in Switzerland
Expatriate footballers in Bangladesh
French expatriate sportspeople in Bangladesh
Expatriate footballers in Oman
French expatriate sportspeople in Oman
Étoile FC players